Club Deportivo Torrijos is a Spanish football team based in Torrijos, in the autonomous community of Castile-La Mancha. Founded in 1954, it plays in Tercera División - Group 18, holding home games at Estadio San Francisco, with a capacity of 2,500 seats.

Season to season

20 seasons in Tercera División

External links
Futbolme team profile 

Football clubs in Castilla–La Mancha
Association football clubs established in 1954
1954 establishments in Spain
Province of Toledo